The Old Corral  is a 1936 American Western film directed by Joseph Kane and starring Gene Autry, Smiley Burnette, and Irene Manning. Based on a story by Bernard McConville, the film is about a sheriff of a small western town who sings his way into a relationship with a singer from a Chicago nightclub who earlier witnessed a murder. The supporting cast features Lon Chaney Jr. and Roy Rogers.

The film features an unshaven Roy Rogers in his second Gene Autry film, then identified under his actual birth name, Leonard Slye, as the leader of the O'Keefe Brothers, played by the singing Sons of the Pioneers, a troupe of western singers trying to break into radio. Rogers' first appearance, in which he and his group rob a busload of people to garner publicity, ends with Autry threatening to arrest Rogers as soon as he's back on a horse. Sixteen months after The Old Corral was released, in the wake of a walkout from the studio by Gene Autry, newly renamed "Roy Rogers" starred in his first feature film, Under Western Stars. The Old Corral would remain Autry's and Rogers' only film together however Roy Rogers appeared in the Gene Autry film The Big Show (released 16 November 1936) with the Sons of the Pioneers as one of several musical acts appearing the film with no interaction with Autry.

Plot
After witnessing nightclub owner Tony Pearl murdered by gangster Mike Scarlotti (John Bradford), blues singer Eleanor Spenser (Irene Manning) flees Chicago and heads West on a bus. Soon her picture appears in newspapers across the country. The bus makes a stop in Turquoise City, New Mexico, where Martin Simms (Cornelius Keefe), the crooked owner of the Blue Moon saloon, befriends Eleanor. After seeing her picture in the newspapers, Simms, who is hoping to collect a reward from Scarlotti, sends the gangster a telegram revealing Eleanor's whereabouts.

The bus is held up by the O'Keefe Brothers (Sons of the Pioneers), a local aspiring singing troupe seeking publicity. Sheriff Gene Autry (Gene Autry) arrests all of the O'Keefe Brothers, except Buck and Tom who escape. Meanwhile, Simms sees Eleanor preparing to leave town and is able to convince her to stay. Gene arrives on the scene and recognizes Eleanor from the bus. She introduces herself as Jane Edwards, the new entertainer at his Blue Moon saloon. Sometime later Gene sees Eleanor's picture in a newspaper and goes to the Blue Moon saloon to protect her against Simms. Gene and Eleanor end up singing a song together.

Gene discovers Buck and Tom in their hideout at the old corral and hires the O'Keefes to perform at the town plaza for Turquoise City's celebration of its new dam. During the concert, Scarlotti arrives and threatens Simms, trying to force him to reveal Eleanor's whereabouts. Deputy Frog (Smiley Burnette) is able to warn Eleanor about Scarlotti's arrival and takes her to the old corral to hide. Scarlotti follows them to the old corral. Gene recruits the O'Keefe Brothers as his posse, who stampede cattle, forcing Scarlotti's men to scatter. Gene arrests Scarlotti, and Eleanor names him as the murderer of Tony Pearl. Gene also arrests Simms for intimidating a witness. Gene then releases the O'Keefe Brothers, sings another song, and kisses Eleanor.

Cast

 Gene Autry as Sheriff Gene Autry
 Smiley Burnette as Deputy Frog
 Irene Manning as Eleanor Spencer, aka Jane Edwards
 Sons of the Pioneers as O'Keefe Brothers
 Champion as Champ, Gene's Horse
 Cornelius Keefe as Martin Simms
 Lon Chaney Jr. as Garland, Simms' partner
 John Bradford as Mike Scarlotti
 Milburn Morante as Clem Snodgrass
 Abe Lefton as Abe, Rodeo Announcer
 Merrill McCormick as Joe, Scarlotti Henchman
 Charles Sullivan as Frank, Scarlotti Henchman
 Buddy Roosevelt as Tony, Scarlotti Driver
 Lynton Brent as Dunn, Dealer
 Frankie Marvin as Wife-beating Prisoner
 Ed 'Oscar' Platt as Oscar, Gas Station Attendant
 Lou Fulton as Elmer, Stuttering Gas Station attendant
 Roy Rogers as Buck O'Keefe (uncredited)
 Hugh Farr as Tom O'Keefe (uncredited)
 Karl Farr as O'Keefe Brother (uncredited)
 Bob Nolan as O'Keefe Brother (uncredited)
 Tim Spencer as O'Keefe Brother (uncredited)

Production

Stuntwork
 Ken Cooper
 Joe Yrigoyen

Soundtrack
 "The Old Corral" (Fleming Allen and Oliver Drake) by Gene Autry while riding in a wagon 
 "One Man Band" (Smiley Burnette) by Smiley Burnette on his one-man band set-up
 "He's Gone, He's Gone Up the Trail" (Tim Spencer) by the Sons of the Pioneers in jail
 "In the Heart of the West" (Fleming Allen and Oliver Drake) by Gene Autry (vocals and guitar) and Irene Manning (vocals) in the saloon
 "Money Ain't No Use Anyway" (Gene Autry) by Gene Autry (vocals and guitar) in the saloon
 "Mexican Hat Dance" (Felipe A. Partichela) at the celebration and danced to by an unidentified couple
 "Silent Trails" (Tim Spencer) by the Sons of the Pioneers in jail
 "So Long Old Pinto" (Fleming Allen and Oliver Drake) by Gene Autry (vocals and guitar) at the celebration
 "Down Along the Sleepy Rio Grande" (Roy Rogers) by the Sons of the Pioneers

References
Citations

Bibliography

External links
 
 
 

1936 films
1936 Western (genre) films
American Western (genre) films
Films directed by Joseph Kane
Republic Pictures films
American black-and-white films
Films produced by Nat Levine
Films with screenplays by Joseph F. Poland
1930s English-language films
1930s American films